In the autumn of 1016, the Danish prince Cnut the Great (Canute) successfully invaded England. Cnut's father, Sweyn Forkbeard, had previously conquered and briefly ruled England for less than five weeks.

The Battle of Brentford was fought in 1016 some time between 9 May (the approximate date Canute landed at Greenwich) and 18 October (the date of the later Battle of Assandun) between the English led by Edmund Ironside and the Danes led by Cnut. It was one of a series of battles fought between Edmund and Canute, ultimately resulting in the lands held by Edmund's father Ethelred the Unready being divided between the two. Edmund was victorious in this particular battle, but ultimately failed to defend the lands inherited from his father.

"Then collected he [Edmund] his force the third time, and went to London, all by north of the Thames, and so out through Clayhanger, and relieved the citizens, driving the enemy to their ships. It was within two nights after that the king went over at Brentford; where he fought with the enemy, and put them to flight: but there many of the English were drowned, from their own carelessness; who went before the main army with a design to plunder.(Anglo-Saxon Chronicle)"

The Battle of Assandun (or Essendune) was fought between Danish and English armies on 18 October 1016. There is disagreement whether Assandun may be Ashdon near Saffron Walden in north Essex or, as long supposed, Ashingdon near Rochford in southeast Essex, England. It ended in victory for the Danes, led by Canute the Great, who triumphed over the English army led by King Edmund Ironside. The battle was the conclusion to the Danish reconquest of England.

The battle is mentioned briefly in Knýtlinga saga which quotes a verse of skaldic poetry by Óttarr svarti, one of Canute's court poets.

During the course of the battle, Eädnoth the Younger, Bishop of Dorchester, was killed by Cnut's men whilst in the act of saying mass on behalf of Edmund Ironside's men. According to Liber Eliensis, Eadnoth's hand was first cut off for a ring, and then his body cut to pieces. The Ealdorman Ulfcytel Snillingr also died in the battle.

Following his defeat, Edmund was forced to sign a treaty with Canute. By this treaty, all of England except Wessex would be controlled by Canute and when one of the kings should die the other would take all of England, that king's son being the heir to the throne. After Edmund's death on 30 November, Canute built a church, chapel or holy site after winning the battle to commemorate the soldiers who died in battle. A few years later in 1020 the completion took place of the memorial church known as Ashingdon Minster, on the hill next to the presumed site of the battle in Ashingdon. The church still stands to this day. Canute attended the dedication of Ashingdon Minster with his bishops and appointed his personal priest, Stigand, to be priest there. The church is now dedicated to Saint Andrew but is believed previously to have been dedicated to Saint Michael, who was considered a military saint: churches dedicated to him are frequently located on a hill.

References

1016 in England
Battles involving the Vikings
Invasions by Denmark
Invasions of England
Battle
Conflicts in 1016
Battles and military actions in London
Military history of Middlesex
Invasion of England